It's a Party may refer to:

Film and television
It's a Party!, a 1986 short film directed by Peg Campbell
"It's a Party" (Project Runway), a 2010 TV episode

Music
It's a Party, a 2000 album by Hi-5

Songs
"It's a Party" (Busta Rhymes song), 1996
"It's a Party", by Buckcherry from All Night Long, 2010
"It's a Party", by the Subways from Money and Celebrity, 2011
"It's a Party", by Tamia from More (non-album track), 2004
"It's a Party", by Vanilla Ice from To the Extreme, 1990